Dearne Valley College is a further education college situated in the Manvers Park area of Wath-upon-Dearne, in the Metropolitan Borough of Rotherham, South Yorkshire, England. It also has a campus near Wath-upon-Dearne town centre.

In September 2017 the college merged with the RNN Group. The college joined Rotherham College and North Nottinghamshire College as part of the group, but continues to retain its local identity and current campus based in Manvers.

References

External links
 Official website
 Get Information Schools Gov Website

Education in Rotherham
Further education colleges in South Yorkshire
Educational institutions established in 1976
1976 establishments in England